Irina Bogacheva (born 30 May 1961) is a retired Kyrgyzstani long-distance runner. She competed in the marathon at the 1996, 2000 and 2004 Summer Olympics with the best result of 14th place in 2000.

Bogacheva consistently ran fast marathons and she has the most sub 2:35 (35), sub 2:40 (59) and sub 2:50 (70) marathon times by a female runner.

International competitions

Marathons

References

External links
 
 marathoninfo.free.fr

1961 births
Living people
Sportspeople from Bishkek
Kyrgyzstani people of Russian descent
Soviet female long-distance runners
Athletes (track and field) at the 1996 Summer Olympics
Athletes (track and field) at the 1998 Asian Games
Athletes (track and field) at the 2000 Summer Olympics
Athletes (track and field) at the 2004 Summer Olympics
Olympic athletes of Kyrgyzstan
Soviet female marathon runners
Kyrgyzstani female long-distance runners
Kyrgyzstani female marathon runners
Universiade medalists in athletics (track and field)
Goodwill Games medalists in athletics
Universiade gold medalists for the Soviet Union
Asian Games competitors for Kyrgyzstan
Competitors at the 1986 Goodwill Games
Competitors at the 1990 Goodwill Games